John Warren Kaiser (October 6, 1926 – May 25, 2022) was Athletics Director Emeritus at St. John's University in Queens, NY. He was an American baseball player, college coach, and administrator. As a player, he helped St. John's to the 1949 College World Series. After a brief minor league career, he became head coach at St. John's. Kaiser managed the short-season Class D Lexington Red Sox in 1957 and 1958. Kaiser led the now-named St. John's Red Storm baseball team to eleven postseason appearances, including three trips to the College World Series (1960, 1966 and 1968) in his 18-year career as head coach.  Kaiser then became athletic director at St. John's, and was instrumental in the establishment of the Big East Conference.

Honors
 Kaiser was inducted into the ABCA Hall of Fame in 1979.
 The Big East Conference baseball tournament Most Outstanding Player Award is named in his honor.
 Jack Kaiser Stadium, home baseball field of the St. John's Red Storm, was constructed in 2000 and is named in his honor.

Head coaching record

College baseball

References

External links

1926 births
2022 deaths
St. John's Red Storm athletic directors
St. John's Red Storm baseball coaches
St. John's Red Storm baseball players
Lexington Red Sox players
Roanoke Ro-Sox players
St. John's Red Storm men's basketball players
St. John's Red Storm men's basketball coaches
St. John's Red Storm men's soccer players
Albany Senators players
Oneonta Red Sox players
Sportspeople from Brooklyn
Association footballers not categorized by position
Association football players not categorized by nationality
Baseball players from New York City
Soccer players from New York City
Basketball players from New York City